The arrondissement of Belfort is an arrondissement in the Bourgogne-Franche-Comté region of France. It is the only arrondissement of the Territoire de Belfort department. It has 101 communes.

Composition

The communes of the arrondissement of Belfort are:

 Andelnans (90001)
 Angeot (90002)
 Anjoutey (90003)
 Argiésans (90004)
 Autrechêne (90082)
 Auxelles-Bas (90005)
 Auxelles-Haut (90006)
 Banvillars (90007)
 Bavilliers (90008)
 Beaucourt (90009)
 Belfort (90010)
 Bermont (90011)
 Bessoncourt (90012)
 Bethonvilliers (90013)
 Boron (90014)
 Botans (90015)
 Bourg-sous-Châtelet (90016)
 Bourogne (90017)
 Brebotte (90018)
 Bretagne (90019)
 Buc (90020)
 Charmois (90021)
 Châtenois-les-Forges (90022)
 Chaux (90023)
 Chavanatte (90024)
 Chavannes-les-Grands (90025)
 Chèvremont (90026)
 Courcelles (90027)
 Courtelevant (90028)
 Cravanche (90029)
 Croix (90030)
 Cunelières (90031)
 Danjoutin (90032)
 Delle (90033)
 Denney (90034)
 Dorans (90035)
 Eguenigue (90036)
 Éloie (90037)
 Essert (90039)
 Étueffont (90041)
 Évette-Salbert (90042)
 Faverois (90043)
 Fêche-l'Église (90045)
 Felon (90044)
 Florimont (90046)
 Fontaine (90047)
 Fontenelle (90048)
 Foussemagne (90049)
 Frais (90050)
 Froidefontaine (90051)
 Giromagny (90052)
 Grandvillars (90053)
 Grosmagny (90054)
 Grosne (90055)
 Joncherey (90056)
 Lachapelle-sous-Chaux (90057)
 Lachapelle-sous-Rougemont (90058)
 Lacollonge (90059)
 Lagrange (90060)
 Lamadeleine-Val-des-Anges (90061)
 Larivière (90062)
 Lebetain (90063)
 Lepuix (90065)
 Lepuix-Neuf (90064)
 Leval (90066)
 Menoncourt (90067)
 Meroux-Moval (90068)
 Méziré (90069)
 Montbouton (90070)
 Montreux-Château (90071)
 Morvillars (90072)
 Novillard (90074)
 Offemont (90075)
 Pérouse (90076)
 Petit-Croix (90077)
 Petitefontaine (90078)
 Petitmagny (90079)
 Phaffans (90080)
 Réchésy (90081)
 Recouvrance (90083)
 Reppe (90084)
 Riervescemont (90085)
 Romagny-sous-Rougemont (90086)
 Roppe (90087)
 Rougegoutte (90088)
 Rougemont-le-Château (90089)
 Saint-Dizier-l'Évêque (90090)
 Saint-Germain-le-Châtelet (90091)
 Sermamagny (90093)
 Sevenans (90094)
 Suarce (90095)
 Thiancourt (90096)
 Trévenans (90097)
 Urcerey (90098)
 Valdoie (90099)
 Vauthiermont (90100)
 Vellescot (90101)
 Vescemont (90102)
 Vétrigne (90103)
 Vézelois (90104)
 Villars-le-Sec (90105)

Demography

History

The arrondissement of Belfort was created in 1800 as a part of the department Haut-Rhin. This arrondissement was larger than the current one, and also included part that is now in the department Haut-Rhin, for instance the communes Cernay, Dannemarie, Masevaux, Saint-Amarin and Thann. In 1871, when most of Haut-Rhin was ceded to Germany, the part remaining in France became the Territoire de Belfort.

As a result of the reorganisation of the cantons of France which came into effect in 2015, the borders of the cantons are no longer related to the borders of the arrondissements. The cantons of the arrondissement of Belfort were, as of January 2015:

 Beaucourt
 Belfort-Centre
 Belfort-Est
 Belfort-Nord
 Belfort-Ouest
 Belfort-Sud
 Châtenois-les-Forges
 Danjoutin
 Delle
 Fontaine
 Giromagny
 Grandvillars
 Offemont
 Rougemont-le-Château
 Valdoie

References

Belfort